Holding My Breath is the fourth full-length studio album by American singer-songwriter Jon McLaughlin. The album was released on September 24, 2013 in the United States. In July 2013, McLaughlin launched a campaign with PledgeMusic, allowing listeners to be involved actively with the making of the album, even releasing the track "Hallelujah" early to pledgers as an incentive on September 7, 2013.

Track listing

As confirmed by Amazon.com.

Charts

References

External links
Razor & Tie
Jon McLaughlin's Facebook

Jon McLaughlin albums
2013 albums
Razor & Tie albums